7093 aluminum alloy is a wrought alloy composed of aluminum, copper, magnesium, zinc, and other elements.

Chemical Composition

References

Aluminum alloy table 

Aluminium–zinc alloys